The Phu Langka Forest Park, or Phu Lang Ka Forest Park, is a protected area of the Phi Pan Nam Range located in Chiang Kham District and Pong District, Phayao Province, Thailand.

The main attractions of the forest park are the "sea of fog" in the valleys in the early morning and the mountains of Doi Hua Ling, Doi Phu Lang Ka and Doi Phu Nom; the latter is a breast-shaped hill rising in an area of grassland.

The vast pink fields of Dok Khlongkhleng (Melastoma malabathricum) are also one of the interesting sights of the park; other plants that are found in the area include Wightia speciosissima, Colquhounia elegans, Dendrobium heterocarpum, Impatiens mengtszeana and Paris polyphylla. Formerly there had been opium cultivation in these mountains.

Phu Langka Forest Park should not be confused with Phu Langka National Park (อุทยานแห่งชาติภูลังกา) in Nakhon Phanom Province.

References

External links
Phu Langka Forest Park - Bangkok Post: Travel

Phi Pan Nam Range
Forest parks of Thailand
Protected areas established in 2002
Tourist attractions in Phayao province
2002 establishments in Thailand